Allariz – Maceda is a comarca in the Galician Province of Ourense. The overall population of this local region is 14,083 (2019).

Municipalities
Allariz, Baños de Molgas, Maceda, Paderne de Allariz, Xunqueira de Ambía and Xunqueira de Espadanedo.

References 

Comarcas of the Province of Ourense